Northern Canada, colloquially the North or the Territories, is the vast northernmost region of Canada variously defined by geography and politics. Politically, the term refers to the three territories of Canada: Yukon, Northwest Territories and Nunavut. This area covers about 48 per cent of Canada's total land area, but has less than 1 per cent of Canada's population.

The terms "northern Canada" or "the North" may be used in contrast with the far north, which may refer to the Canadian Arctic, the portion of Canada that lies north of the Arctic Circle, east of Alaska and west of Greenland. However, in many other uses the two areas are treated as a single unit.


Definitions

Subdivisions 
As a social rather than political region, the Canadian North is often subdivided into two distinct regions based on climate, the near north and the far north. The different climates of these two regions result in vastly different vegetation, and therefore very different economies, settlement patterns, and histories.

Near north

The "near north" or sub-Arctic is mostly synonymous with the Canadian boreal forest, a large area of evergreen-dominated forests with a subarctic climate. This area has traditionally been home to the Indigenous peoples of the Subarctic, that is the First Nations, who were hunters of moose, freshwater fishers and trappers. This region was heavily involved in the North American fur trade during its peak importance, and is home to many Métis people who originated in that trade. The area was mostly part of Rupert's Land under the nominal control of the Hudson's Bay Company (HBC) from 1670 to 1869  who regarded Rupert's Land as their proprietary colony.

In 1670, King Charles II of England in his grant creating the proprietary colony Rupert's Land defined its frontiers as all the lands adjudging Hudson Strait, Hudson Bay or rivers flowing into Hudson Bay, in theory giving control of much of what is now Canada to the HBC. Under the royal charter of 2 May 1670, the HBC received the theoretical control of  making up 40% of what is now Canada. Despite its claim that Rupert's Land was a proprietary colony, the HBC only controlled the areas around its forts (trading post) on the shores of James Bay and Hudson Bay, and never sought to impose political control on the First Nations peoples, whose co-operation was needed for the fur trade. For its first century, the HBC never ventured inland, being content to have the First Nations peoples come to its forts to trade fur for European goods. The HBC only started to move inland in the late 18th century to assert its claim to Rupert's Land in response to rival fur traders coming out of Montreal who were hurting profits by going directly to the First Nations.

The HBC's claim to Rupert's Land, which, as the company was the de facto administrator, included the North-Western Territory, was purchased by the Canadian government in 1869. After buying Rupert's Land, Canada renamed the area it had purchased the Northwest Territories. Shortly thereafter the government made a series of treaties with the local First Nations regarding land title. This opened the region to non-Native settlement, as well as to forestry, mining, and oil and gas drilling. In 1896, gold was discovered in the Yukon, leading to the Klondike Gold Rush in 1896-1899 and the first substantial white settlements were made in the near north. To deal with the increased settlement in the Klondike, the Yukon Territory was created in 1898.

Today several million people live in the near north, around 15% of the Canadian total. Large parts of the near north are not part of Canada's territories, but rather are the northern parts of the provinces of Quebec, Ontario, Manitoba, Saskatchewan, and Alberta, meaning they have very different political histories as minority regions within larger units. In the late 19th and early 20th centuries, Canada reduced the size of the Northwest Territory by carving out new provinces out of it such as Alberta, Saskatchewan, and Manitoba together with the new territory of the Yukon while transferring other parts of the Northwest Territory to Ontario and Quebec.

Far north

The "far north" is synonymous with the areas north of the tree line: the Barren Grounds and tundra. This area is home to the various sub-groups of the Inuit, a people unrelated to other Indigenous peoples in Canada. These are people who have traditionally relied mostly on hunting marine mammals and caribou, mainly barren-ground caribou, as well as fish and migratory birds. The Inuit lived in groups that pursued a hunter-gather lifestyle, with a basic governmental system in which power was exercised by the local headman, a person acknowledged to be the best hunter, and the angakkuq, sometimes called shamans. This area was somewhat involved in the fur trade, but was more influenced by the whaling industry. Britain maintained a claim to the far north as part of the British Arctic Territories, and in 1880 transferred its claim to Canada, who included the far north into the Northwest Territories.

The Inuit were not aware of the existence of the British Arctic territory claim nor were they aware for some time afterwards that under international law their territories had just been included in Canada. It was not until 1920 when detachments of the Royal Canadian Mounted Police (RCMP) started being sent into the far north to enforce Canadian law that Canadian sovereignty over the region became effective. This area was not part of the early 20th century treaty process and aboriginal title to the land has been acknowledged by the Canadian government with the creation of autonomous territories instead of the Indian reserves of further south.

In 1982 a referendum was held to decide on splitting the Northwest Territories. This was followed by the 1992 Nunavut creation referendum with the majority of the people in far north voting to leave the Northwest Territories, leading to the new territory of Nunavut being created in 1999. Very few non-Indigenous  people have settled in these areas, and the residents of the far north represent less than 1% of Canada's total population.

The far north is also often broken into the west and eastern parts and sometimes a central part. The eastern Arctic which means the self-governing territory of Nunavut (much of which is in the true Arctic, being north of the Arctic Circle), sometimes excluding Cambridge Bay and Kugluktuk; Nunavik, an autonomous part of the province of Quebec; Nunatsiavut, an autonomous part of the province of Newfoundland and Labrador; and perhaps a few parts of the Hudson Bay coast of Ontario and Manitoba. The western Arctic is the northernmost portion of the Northwest Territories (roughly Inuvik Region) and a small part of Yukon, together called the Inuvialuit Settlement Region and sometimes includes Cambridge Bay and Kugluktuk. The central Arctic covers the pre-division Kitikmeot Region, Northwest Territories.

Territoriality
Since 1925, Canada has claimed the portion of the Arctic between 60°W and 141°W longitude, extending all the way north to the North Pole: all islands in the Arctic Archipelago and Herschel, off the Yukon coast, form part of the region, are Canadian territory and the territorial waters claimed by Canada surround these islands. Views of territorial claims in this region are complicated by disagreements on legal principles. Canada and the Soviet Union/Russia have long claimed that their territory extends according to the sector principle to the North Pole. The United States does not accept the sector principle and does not make a sector claim based on its Alaskan Arctic coast. Claims that undersea geographic features are extensions of a country's continental shelf are also used to support claims; for example the Denmark/Greenland claim on territory to the North Pole, some of which is disputed by Canada.

Foreign ships, both civilian and military, are allowed the right of innocent passage through the territorial waters of a littoral state subject to conditions in the United Nations Convention on the Law of the Sea. The right of innocent passage is not allowed, however, in internal waters, which are enclosed bodies of water or waters landward of a chain of islands. Disagreements about the sector principle or extension of territory to the North Pole and about the definition of internal waters in the Arctic lie behind differences in territorial claims in the Arctic. This claim is recognized by most countries with some exceptions, including the United States; Denmark, Russia, and Norway have made claims similar to those of Canada in the Arctic and are opposed by the European Union and the United States. This is especially important with the Northwest Passage. Canada asserts control of this passage as part of the Canadian Internal Waters because it is within  of Canadian islands; the United States claims that it is in international waters. Today ice and freezing temperatures make this a minor issue, but climate change may make the passage more accessible to shipping, something that concerns the Canadian government and inhabitants of the environmentally sensitive region.

Topography (geography)

While the largest part of the Arctic is composed of permanent ice and the Canadian Arctic tundra north of the tree line, it encompasses geological regions of varying types: the Innuitian Mountains, associated with the Arctic Cordillera mountain system, are geologically distinct from the Arctic Region (which consists largely of lowlands). The Arctic and Hudson Bay Lowlands comprise a substantial part of the geographic region often considered part of the Canadian Shield (in contrast to the sole geological area). The ground in the Arctic is mostly composed of permafrost, making construction difficult and often hazardous, and agriculture virtually impossible.

The Arctic watershed (or drainage basin) drains northern parts of Manitoba, Alberta and British Columbia, most of the Northwest Territories and Nunavut as well as parts of Yukon into the Arctic Ocean, including the Beaufort Sea and Baffin Bay. With the exception of the Mackenzie River, Canada's longest river, this watershed has been little used for hydroelectricity. The Peace and Athabasca rivers along with Great Bear and Great Slave Lake (respectively the largest and second largest lakes wholly enclosed within Canada), are significant elements of the Arctic watershed. Each of these elements eventually merges with the Mackenzie so that it thereby drains the vast majority of the Arctic watershed.

Climate

Overview
Under the Köppen climate classification, much of mainland Northern Canada has a subarctic climate, with a tundra climate in most of the Arctic Archipelago and on the northern coasts, and an Ice cap climate in some parts of the Arctic Cordillera. For more than half of the year, much of Northern Canada is snow and ice-covered, with some limited moderation by the relatively warmer waters in coastal areas with temperatures generally remaining below the freezing mark from October to May. Owing to the dry cold air prevalent throughout most of the region, snowfall is often light in nature. During the short summers, much of Northern Canada is snow free, except for the Arctic Cordillera which remains covered with snow and ice throughout the year. In the summer months, temperatures average below  and may occasionally exceed .

Demographics

Although vast, the entire region is very sparsely populated. As of 2021, only about 118,160 people lived there compared to 36,991,981 in the rest of Canada.

It is heavily endowed with natural resources and in most cases they are very expensive to extract and situated in fragile environmental areas. Though GDP per person is higher than elsewhere in Canada, the region remains relatively poor, mostly because of the extremely high cost of most consumer goods, and the region is heavily subsidised by the government of Canada.

As of 2016, 53.3% of the population of the three territories (23.3% in Yukon, 50.7% in the NWT and 85.9% in Nunavut) is Indigenous, Inuit, First Nations or Métis. The Inuit are the largest group of Indigenous peoples in Northern Canada, and 53.0% of all Canada's Inuit live in Northern Canada, with Nunavut accounting for 46.4%. The region also contains several groups of First Nations, who are mainly Dene with the Chipewyan making up the largest sub-group. The three territories each have a greater proportion of Aboriginal inhabitants than any of Canada's provinces. There are also many more recent immigrants from around the world; of the territories, Yukon has the largest percentage of non-Aboriginal inhabitants, while Nunavut the smallest.

 census, the largest settlement in Northern Canada is the capital of Yukon, Whitehorse with 28,201. Second is Yellowknife, the capital of the Northwest Territories, which contains 20,340 inhabitants. Third is Iqaluit, the capital of Nunavut, with 7,429.

Recent
Although it has not been on the same scale, some towns and cities have experienced population increases not seen for several decades before. Yellowknife has become the centre of diamond production for Canada (which has become one of the top three countries for diamonds).

In the 2006 Canadian Census, the three territories posted a combined population of over 100,000 people for the first time in Canadian history.

See also

Arctic policy of Canada
Geography of Canada
Northern Alberta
Northern Manitoba
Northern Ontario
Northern Quebec
Northern United States
Northern Saskatchewan
Operation Hurricane (Canada)

References

Further reading

 Honderich, John. Arctic Imperative: Is Canada Losing the North? Toronto, Ont.: University of Toronto Press, 1987. xi, 258 p., ill. in b&w with charts, maps, and photos. 
 Mowat, Farley. Canada North, in series, The Canadian Illustrated Library. Toronto: McClelland and Stewart, 1967. 127, [1] p., copiously ill. in b&w and col.

External links

 
 Conference Board of Canada: Centre for the North
 The Papers of Herbert R. Drury on Arctic Canada at Dartmouth College Library
 Gerard Gardner Scientific Observations Records in Arctic Canada and Labrador at Dartmouth College Library

 
Regions of Canada
Regions of the Arctic